Chronicle Extra (formerly known as The Herald and Post) is a free newspaper delivered weekly to residents in the Tyne and Wear and Northumberland area. The paper includes general news and information about that area within the last week. As well as News it also has information on sports and sells advertising Space to anyone needing it.

Employees
The Herald and Post employs people to deliver the papers and anyone over thirteen is allowed to join the waiting list in the hope of getting a paper round to earn money.

Name change
In 2007, the owners of the paper (Trinity Mirror, now known as Reach plc) decided to rebrand The Herald and Post, as Chronicle Extra to become the sister paper of the Evening Chronicle.

External links

Newspapers published in Tyne and Wear
Reach plc